Stanford is a town in and the county seat of Judith Basin County, Montana, United States. The population was at 403 as of the 2020 census.

Stanford began with the establishment of a trading post by Thomas C. Power in 1875. In 1908 the town moved about 3 miles to be next to the new railroad.

The Judith Basin County Museum is in town.

Geography and climate
Stanford is located at  (47.153083, -110.219175). U.S. Route 87 passes through town.

Demographics

As of 2000 the median income for a household in the town was $22,679, and the median income for a family was $34,479. Males had a median income of $22,813 versus $20,000 for females. The per capita income for the town was $15,253. About 9.7% of families and 13.8% of the population were below the poverty line, including 22.5% of those under age 18 and 5.6% of those age 65 or over.

2010 census
As of the census of 2010, there were 401 people, 198 households, and 110 families residing in the town. The racial makeup of the town was 97.3% White, 0.2% African American, 2.0% Native American, 0.2% from other races, and 0.2% from two or more races. Hispanic or Latino of any race were 1.5% of the population.

There were 198 households, of which 22.2% had children under the age of 18 living with them, 47.0% were married couples living together, 5.1% had a female householder with no husband present, 3.5% had a male householder with no wife present, and 44.4% were non-families. 40.4% of all households were made up of individuals, and 17.7% had someone living alone who was 65 years of age or older. The average household size was 2.03 and the average family size was 2.72.

The median age in the town was 49.4 years. 19.5% of residents were under the age of 18; 3.2% were between the ages of 18 and 24; 18.6% were from 25 to 44; 37.2% were from 45 to 64; and 21.4% were 65 years of age or older. The gender makeup of the town was 51.4% male and 48.6% female.

Infrastructure
Stanford Airport (Biggerstaff Field) is a county-owned, public-use airport located one mile (2 km) south of town.

Education
Stanford Public Schools educates students from kindergarten through 12th grade. Stanford High School is a Class C school (less than 108 students) which helps determine athletic competitions. They are known as the Wolves.

The Judith Basin County Free Library is located in Stanford.

Notable person
 Albert Henry Ottenweller, Roman Catholic bishop

Dr Lewis Coriell, virologist, who was instrumental in developing tissue culture techniques that were considered a break-through in the production of the polio vaccine.  Founded Coriell Institute in 1953, a non-profit medical research center still in existence.

References

External links

 Community information

Towns in Judith Basin County, Montana
County seats in Montana